Bilorichenska coal mine ranks among the biggest companies of Ukraine. It is located in Belorechenskiy, Lutuhynskiy district of Luhansk region, Ukraine. The mined coal rank is "G" – electric-power coke. As of 1 June 2011 the mine's reserves amounted to 11.6 million tons. There is a possibility of expanding the size of the reserves, and if so, the mine able reserves could amount up to 70 million tons of coal.

History
The design and engineering of the mine began in 1949. The project was named Bilorichenska after Belaya river. The mine was planned in the area where "a burning stone" in the chalk deposits was found in the 18th century.  The building of the shaft started in December 1950 and construction of the surface structures started in September 1951. The mine was commissioned in 1957.

In the period 1960–70, Bilorichenska's miners were the winners of all-union socialist competitions on several occasions. In 1975 the mine exceeded the targeted state plan and raised 670 thousand tons of coal. The mine continued to work  at this rate for the following one and a half decades.

After the collapse of the Soviet Union, production decreased rapidly due to lack of investments and technology. By 1996 coal production amounted to only 193 thousand of tons. By this time, all the coal reserves of the coal beds Almaznyi and Kamenskiy series had been exhausted.

In September 2002 a new shaft commenced operation, equipped with 3RD-90 heavy-duty complex. Due to this, in 2003 for the first time in its history the mine acquired the capacity of 750 thousand tons. In 2008 the mine first reached its planned target of "1 million tons of coal" per year.

During the following seven years a series of faces along the L 6 bed 725 m horizon were put into production, namely: the original eastern, 5th western, 2nd eastern, 2nd western, 6th western, 5th bis western, 3rd western and 1st bis eastern. Each of these faces is equipped with modern heavy-duty complexes and machines.

In 2010, coal production at Bilorichenska amounted to 1.182 million tons. In 2011 one more face was put into production, the 7th western. Its production totalled above 100 thousand tons of coal per month. A Coal Dry Cleaning Machine was put into operation and a new Diesel House opened at the mine.

As of 2012, the mine had a workforce of over 3000 employees.

Ownership
After the collapse of the Soviet Union, the mine belonged to the state owned Luhanskvuhillya coal mining group. In 2001, the mine declared insolvency and the re-capitalisation process started. In 2002 the mine obtained a strategic partner Valentin-Invest, a holding company of Ukrainian businessman Igor Martynenkov, who obtained the majority stake in the mine while the state-owned shares decreased to 25.83%. The recapitalisation plan was approved by the court in 2007. This decision was annulled by the  High Commercial Court of Ukraine in 2010.

In 2012 the court decided to return the mine into the state ownership.  On 14 September 2012, the Ukrainian state took control over the mine by force.  Some media sources link this action to the participation of Igor Martynenkov at the parliamentary election running against the candidate of the Party of Regions.

Production safety

At the mine territory, a rescue-workers school was built, which later became a basis for the only mine rescue station in Ukraine. In order to reduce the danger of fire in the mine, during 2004 the mine purchased 14 units “YUREK-6”, which made it possible to equip all the main and local conveyor lines with fire-fighting systems.

Social responsibility
Bilorichenska mine has renovated a culture centre and a nursing school "Rosinka" (Dewdrop) of Belorechenskiy settlement and opened a museum of Bilorichenska mine. In August 2011 gas lines were led in the settlement. Water supply and sewerage of Belorechenskiy township are provided, managed by the mine.

See also 

 Coal in Ukraine
 List of mines in Ukraine

References

External links
 Company’s official site

Coal mines in Ukraine
Buildings and structures in Luhansk Oblast
Coal mining disasters in Ukraine
Underground mines in Ukraine
Coal mines in the Soviet Union